Arau may refer to:
Arau
Arau (federal constituency), represented in the Dewan Rakyat
Bandar Arau (state constituency), formerly represented in the Perlis State Legislative Assembly (1974–86)
Arau (state constituency), formerly represented in the Perlis State Council (1955–59); Perlis State Legislative Assembly (1959–74)